Lee C. Teng (5 September 1926 – 24 June 2022) is a senior physicist emeritus at the Advanced Photon Source of the Argonne National Laboratory.  He has made numerous contributions to the field of accelerator physics.

Career
Teng was born in Beijing, China, but his ancestral home is in Fuzhou. He graduated from The Catholic University of Peking (now Fu Jen University) in Beijing in 1946. Teng left his native China in 1947 to attend graduate school in physics at the University of Chicago.

Since receiving his PhD in 1951, Lee has worked at the University of Minnesota, the Wichita State University, Argonne National Laboratory, and the Fermi National Accelerator Laboratory (Fermilab).  He was the Director of the Particle Accelerator Division at Argonne National Laboratory.

In 1983, Teng took a partial leave of absence from Fermilab to serve as the founding director of what is now the National Synchrotron Radiation Research Center (NSRRC) in Taiwan.

Honors
In 1956, on his first trip to Taiwan he was awarded the "Gold Medal of Achievement" by the Chinese Ministry of Education.

He received the "Distinguished Service Award" from the American Immigrants Service League in 1962.

In 1964 he was elected to member (Academician) of Academia Sinica, Taiwan/Republic of China.

He was conferred an "Honorary Professor" of the Beijing Normal University in 1970.

In 2007, the American Physical Society awarded Teng the Robert R. Wilson Prize for Achievement in the Physics of Particle Accelerators.

The "Lee Teng Internship in Accelerator Science and Engineering" was created jointly by Argonne, Fermilab, and the US Particle Accelerator School in 2007 in Teng's honor.

Death

Lee Teng passed away on 24 June 2022, after a period in hospice care.

Further reading
"Lee Teng's Autobiography: Accelerators and I", ICFA Newsletter No. 35, p. 8, 2004
"Lee Teng: a passion for the accelerator fast lane", Cern Courrier, Oct. 17, 2007

References

20th-century Taiwanese physicists
Accelerator physicists
Catholic University of Peking alumni
University of Chicago alumni
University of Minnesota faculty
Wichita State University faculty
Argonne National Laboratory people
People associated with Fermilab
Educators from Beijing
Living people
Members of Academia Sinica
Physicists from Beijing
Year of birth missing (living people)
Taiwanese people from Beijing
Fellows of the American Physical Society